Spathulina hessii is a species of tephritid or fruit flies in the genus Spathulina of the family Tephritidae.

Distribution
South Africa.

References

Tephritinae
Insects described in 1818
Diptera of Africa